Munna Khan, also known as Mujibulla Khan, is a member of parliament of India (Rajya Sabha) elected unopposed from Odisha on the ticket of Biju Janata Dal during 2020 Indian Rajya Sabha elections. He was one of the four new elect MPs of Biju Janata Dal elected unopposed since the major opposition party BJP refused to field any candidate from the state.

He was with Janata Dal earlier and joined Biju Janata Dal after its formation. He was also BJD’s minority cell president for a brief period.

Before becoming full time politician Munna Khan started his career as an Odia film actor and moved to politics at the age of 23. He is best known for Mamata Ra Dori (1989), Mu Premi Mu Pagala (2011) and Mu Kana Ete Kharap (2010).

References

External links

Year of birth missing (living people)
Living people
Biju Janata Dal politicians
Male actors from Odisha
Rajya Sabha members from Odisha